The Constitutional and Mainland Affairs Bureau is a ministerial-level policy bureaux of the Government of Hong Kong responsible for the implementation of the Basic Law, including electoral matters and promotion of equal opportunities and privacy protection. The bureau also functions as the intermediary between the HKSAR Government and the Central People's Government and other Mainland authorities under the principles of "One Country, Two Systems", including the coordination of liaison between the HKSAR Government and Central authorities, promoting regional co-operation initiatives between Hong Kong and the Mainland, and overseeing the operation of offices of the HKSAR Government on the Mainland.

The bureau is headed by the Secretary for Constitutional and Mainland Affairs, Mr Erick Tsang.

History 
The former Constitutional Affairs Branch was formed by a reorganisation of the Government Secretariat in 1989. Upon the handover on 1 July 1997, the Branch was renamed the Constitutional Affairs Bureau. Under Donald Tsang's re-organisation of the Government Secretariat in 2007, the Bureau was renamed the Constitutional and Mainland Affairs Bureau to reflect the Bureau's portfolio for coordination of the HKSAR’s relationship with the Mainland. In the re-organisation, the Bureau was also assigned portfolios relating to human rights and access to information as guaranteed in the Basic Law.

The Bureau has been responsible for Hong Kong's electoral reforms. Since the 1994 electoral reform, the Secretary for Constitutional Affairs has represented the Government in moving government bills for amending electoral laws in the Legislative Council. Pursuant to the last electoral reform sparked by amendment of Annexes I and II of the Basic Law by the Standing Committee of the National People's Congress on 31 March 2021, the Secretary for Constitutional and Mainland Affairs Bureau introduced the Improving Electoral System (Consolidated Amendments) Bill 2021 to the Legislative Council to amend local legislations accordingly. The Bureau released the Green Paper on Constitutional Development in July 2007 for public consultation on the options, roadmap and timetable for implementing universal suffrage for Chief Executive elections and Legislative Council elections.

The Bureau has also set up offices in the Mainland and Taiwan, including the Beijing Office of the HKSAR Government, Hong Kong Economic and Trade Offices on the Mainland and the Hong Kong Economic, Trade and Cultural Office in Taipei.

Recent incidents 
In October 2020, Apple Daily reported that the agency had ordered government departments to report any public sightings of the Republic of China flag, and to remove the flags when the public or media are not around.

In April 2022, the department revealed it had spent more than HK$16,000,000 on publicity to promote the 2021 Hong Kong electoral changes.

Agencies
The following are agencies which are related to this bureau.
Office of the Government of the Hong Kong Special Administrative Region in Beijing
Registration and Electoral Office
 Hong Kong Economic and Trade Office (Guangdong, Shanghai and Chengdu)
Television and Entertainment Licensing Authority
Office of the Privacy Commissioner for Personal Data
Equal Opportunities Commission
 Hong Kong–Taiwan Economic and Cultural Co-operation and Promotion Council
Basic Law Promotion Steering Committee

Registration and Electoral Office

Registration Deadlines 
Eligible residents may submit an application for new voter registration and registered voters may report on change of registration particulars at any time of the year. However, electors who wish to have their registration processed or their information updated in the same cycle or to be listed in the final registers, they must submit their application forms to the Registration and Electoral Office on or before the statutory deadlines.

Registration Statistics 
Hong Kong has seen a major surge in voter registrations, particularly among young people. Nearly 386,000 people have registered to vote in the past year, a record high since the handover of Hong Kong. The Registration & Elector Office updates and publishes the Final Registers every year.

See also 
 Mainland Affairs Council
Elections in Hong Kong
 Electoral Affairs Commission
 Home Affairs Department
 Election commission
 Independent Commission Against Corruption (Hong Kong)
 Clean Elections

References

External links 
 http://www.cmab.gov.hk (Official site)

Hong Kong government policy bureaux
Hong Kong
Hong Kong
Human rights organisations based in Hong Kong
Women's rights in Hong Kong